(born 19 August 1971) is a Japanese video game music composer. She began her career with video game company Capcom, and later co-founded the music studio Unique Note with another ex-Capcom composer, Tetsuya Shibata.

Life and career
Yoshino Aoki was born in Kanagawa, Japan, and studied classical music as a child. She began playing piano at the age six, began learning the flute at age 13, and started using a synthesizer shortly thereafter. In high school, she sang classical music and played the keyboard in her own band. In college, she studied music education and classical singing.

After graduating from college, Aoki went to work for video game company Capcom, where she began her career by arranging Kinuyo Yamashita's score for the CD re-release of Capcom's Mega Man X3, along with three other members of Capcom's sound team. In 2007 she left Capcom to pursue a freelance career. She is currently in employment with sound studio Unique Note Co., Ltd., a studio founded by Tetsuya Shibata and herself. She acts as the company's vice president, as well as a composer, arranger, and lyricist.

Yoshino Aoki is also known for her vocal role in the song "Kaze yo, Tsutaete", often used as the theme song for the Mega Man character Roll.

Works

References

External links

Artist profile at OverClocked ReMix

1971 births
20th-century Japanese composers
20th-century Japanese women singers
20th-century Japanese singers
20th-century women composers
21st-century Japanese composers
21st-century Japanese women singers
21st-century Japanese singers
21st-century women composers
Capcom people
Freelance musicians
Japanese women composers
Living people
Musicians from Kanagawa Prefecture
Video game composers